Hund's rule of maximum multiplicity is a rule based on observation of atomic spectra, which is used to predict the ground state of an atom or molecule with one or more open electronic shells. The rule states that for a given electron configuration, the lowest energy term is the one with the greatest value of spin multiplicity. This implies that if two or more orbitals of equal energy are available, electrons will occupy them singly before filling them in pairs. The rule, discovered by Friedrich Hund in 1925, is of important use in atomic chemistry, spectroscopy, and quantum chemistry, and is often abbreviated to Hund's rule, ignoring Hund's other two rules.

Atoms
The multiplicity of a state is defined as 2S + 1, where S is the total electronic spin. A high multiplicity state is therefore the same as a high-spin state. The lowest-energy state with maximum multiplicity usually has unpaired electrons all with parallel spin. Since the spin of each electron is 1/2, the total spin is one-half the number of unpaired electrons, and the multiplicity is the number of unpaired electrons + 1. For example, the nitrogen atom ground state has three unpaired electrons of parallel spin, so that the total spin is 3/2 and the multiplicity is 4.

The lower energy and increased stability of the atom arise because the high-spin state has  unpaired electrons of parallel spin, which must reside in different spatial orbitals according to the Pauli exclusion principle. An early but incorrect explanation of the lower energy of high multiplicity states was that the different occupied spatial orbitals create a larger average distance between electrons, reducing electron-electron repulsion energy. However, quantum-mechanical calculations with accurate wave functions since the 1970s have shown that the actual physical reason for the increased stability is a decrease in the screening of electron-nuclear attractions, so that the unpaired electrons can approach the nucleus more closely and the electron-nuclear attraction is increased.

As a result of Hund's rule, constraints are placed on the way atomic orbitals are filled in the ground state using the Aufbau principle. Before any two electrons occupy an orbital in a subshell, other orbitals in the same subshell must first each contain one electron. Also, the electrons filling a subshell will have parallel spin before the shell starts filling up with the opposite spin electrons (after the first orbital gains a second electron). As a result, when filling up atomic orbitals, the maximum number of unpaired electrons (and hence maximum total spin state) is assured.

For example, in the oxygen atom, the 2p4 subshell arranges its electrons as [↑↓] [↑] [↑] rather than [↑↓] [↑] [↓] or [↑↓] [↑↓][ ]. The manganese (Mn) atom has a 3d5 electron configuration with five unpaired electrons all of parallel spin, corresponding to a 6S ground state. The superscript 6 is the value of the multiplicity,  corresponding to five unpaired electrons with parallel spin in accordance with Hund's rule.

An atom can have a ground state with two incompletely filled subshells which are close in energy. The lightest example is the chromium (Cr) atom with a 3d54s electron configuration. Here there are six unpaired electrons all of parallel spin for a 7S ground state.

Molecules
Although most stable molecules have closed electron shells, a few have unpaired electrons for which Hund's rule is applicable. The most important example is the dioxygen molecule, O2, which has two degenerate pi antibonding molecular orbitals (π*) occupied by only two electrons. In accordance with Hund's rule, the ground state is triplet oxygen with two unpaired electrons in singly occupied orbitals. The singlet oxygen state with one doubly occupied and one empty π* is an excited state with different chemical properties and greater reactivity than the ground state.

Exception
 In 2004, researchers reported the synthesis of 5-dehydro-m-xylylene (DMX), the first organic molecule known to violate Hund's rule.

See also
 Hund's rules (includes this plus 2 other rules)
 High spin metal complexes

References

External links
A glossary entry hosted on the web site of the Chemistry Department of Purdue University

Quantum chemistry
Rules